Mizoram University is a central university under the University Grants Commission, Government of India, and was established on 2 July 2001, by the Mizoram University Act (2000) of the Parliament of India. The President of India is the official Visitor, and the Governor of Mizoram acts as the Chief Rector as per Mizoram University (Amendment) Bill, 2007.

History
The university is the fruit of the Mizoram Peace Accord between Mizo National Front and Government of India on 30 June 1986. However, it was not created de novo. The North Eastern Hill University, with its headquarters at Shillong had already run its Mizoram campus since 1978. The Mizoram University Act by the Parliament of India officially established the school on 2 July 2001, incorporating all the facilities of the existing Mizoram campus of NEHU. The jurisdiction of the university, therefore, extends to the whole of Mizoram. Initially, the university had seven academic departments inherited from NEHU, but it now has a total of 18 academic departments. It hopes to bring the number to a total of 27 departments within the current Xth Plan. The university under NEHU functioned from various rented buildings in Aizawl for over two decades.

Campus

Mizoram University has changed immensely after the recent move of the main administration and some academic departments to its permanent campus at Tanhril, Aizawl. Except for a few remaining academic departments, the Sports Cell, the Medical Clinic and Central Library, the university is now well consolidated in its main campus. It is now undergoing a sea change, thanks to the development and construction works taking place with the help of the sum of Rs. 25 crores from DoNER and anticipated commitment of UGC Grant for the Infrastructure of Development of Mizoram University under Xth Plan amounting to Rs. 43.50 Crores.

Forests and flora 
The Mizoram University campus contains regenerating tropical wet evergreen and semi-evergreen forests, including a protected forested water catchment reserve in the north and a small biodiversity park. Several streams flow through the campus. Setlak Lui (Lui means river in Mizo) runs along the valley and is joined by Rultawi Lui, Hratdawng Lui, Lalmangkhawng Lui, and Lungsumzau Lui. Kel Lui and Chengkawl Lui also flow through the area. These streams mostly flow in a north-westerly direction to join the Tlawng River.

The plant life includes 384 species of vascular plants in 290 genera and 107 families. Common plants species include trees like Aporusa octandra, Castanopsis tribuloides, Schima wallichii, Bischofia javanica, and Anogeissus acuminata, shrubs like Melastoma nepalensis and Clerodedrum infortunatum, herbaceous plants like Imperata cylindrica, Erianthus longisetosus, Bidens biternata, and Knoxia corymbosa, and invasive alien species including Chromolaena odorata and Mikania micrantha. Bamboo species present include Melocanna baccifera, Dendrocalamus hamiltonii and Dendrocalamus longispathus.

Animal diversity 

The campus also has a rich diversity of animal species. Among reptiles, there are 23 species of snakes in four families, including Boiga cyanea, Elaphe porphyracea, Gonyosoma prasina, Pareas monticola, Rhabdops bicolor, Trachischium tenuiceps, Rhabdophis subminiatus, Trimerusurus erythrurus, Bungarus niger, Naja kaouthia, and Ophiophagus hannah.  The campus is noted as an eBird hotspot with about 60 species listed at present including species such as Eurasian Wryneck, Black-crested Bulbul and many others. Mammals such as Hoary-bellied Squirrel and Pallas's Squirrel also occur.

Organisation and administration

Schools and departments
There are 9 schools functioning.

Centers

Centre for study on disability
The centre for the study on disability is the first of its kind in the country which was inaugurated by Mizoram CM Pu Lalthanhawla in 2018. It joint initiative of the National Institute for Locomotor Disabilities, Calcutta and the department of social work, Mizoram University.

Incubation Centre 
The incubation centres are the first of its kind to be hosted by a central university in the eastern region which will cater to the needs of people having novel ideas and provide them facilities to work with their ideas for startups. The Management Department of Mizoram University supports the Incubation Centre. Mizoram Kailawn, a platform to promote entrepreneurship in Mizoram is one of the outcomes of the Incubation Centre.

Women's study center

Constituent college

Pachhunga University College is the only constituent college of the university. It is located toward the hub of Aizawl, at College Veng. It was established on 15 August 1958. It had been the constituent college of NEHU, and with the establishment of Mizoram University, the legal administration was automatically handed over to the new university. The college offers 19 subjects - 11 arts, seven science and one commerce. Annual enrolment of students averages 1280. There are 86 permanent teaching faculty.

Software Technology Park of India
Mizoram University has provided 5 acres of land to establish Software Technology Parks of India for which an MoU has been signed for a 66-year lease.

Affiliates
At present, there are 31 undergraduate colleges, including two professional institutions and one constituent college. The total roll-strength in these institutions is approximately 87,500 students, excluding that of the constituent college.

College of Teachers Education, Aizawl
Government Aizawl College
Government Aizawl North College
Government Aizawl West College
Government Champhai College
Government Hrangbana College
Government J. Buana College
Government J. Thankima College
Government Johnson College
Government Kolasib College
Government Mizoram Law College
Government Saiha College
Government Serchhip College
Government T. Romana College
Government Zirtiri Residential Science College

Government Mamit College
Government Saitual College
Government Lawngtlai College
Government Khawzawl College
Government Hnahthial College
Government Zawlnuam College
Helen Lowry College of Arts & Commerce
Kamalanagar College
Lunglei Government College
Mizoram College of Nursing
Mizoram Institute of Medical Education & Research
National Institute of Electronics and Information Technology, Aizawl
Pachhunga University College (constituent college)
St. Xavier's College, Lengpui
Regional Institute of Paramedical and Nursing Aizawl
Higher and Technical Institute of Mizoram

Academics

Rankings 

The university was ranked 67th among universities in India by the National Institutional Ranking Framework (NIRF) in 2020 and in the 100th overall. According to Outlook-ICARE rankings 2019 of top Central universities, Mizoram University ranked 12th overall.

Student life

Student Union
Mizoram University Students Council (MZUSC) is primarily responsible for building and preserving a healthy political culture in the campus. The Students Council holds Freshers to welcome new students and also a University festival called Vibrio.

Publication
Mizoram University has an Annual Magazine called Lunglohtui and a monthly newsletter called Silhouette published by the Department of Mass Communication.
It has several journals such as Science & Technology Journal, Administrative Studies, Management Convergence, Contemporary Social Scientist, Geographic Journal, Journal of Literature and Culture Studies and the Mizoram University Journal of Humanities & Social Sciences that are published by various departments and schools of Mizoram University.

Library
The library has barcode technology and an RFID library management system. Free online access is available through the Internet.

Sports
Mizoram University has a well-equipped gym with football, basketball and table tennis facilities. An annual sports meet is held once a year in September. 
Mizoram University has a football team which has been champion of East Zone Inter University Tournament in 2008 and 2009, Runner up in 2010. Quarter finalist of all India Inter university football tournament in 2008 and 2010 and Champion in 2010.

Hall of Residence (Hostels)
Mizoram University has five (5) Girls' Hostel and seven(7) of a Boys' Hostel named as :

1) Ainawn Hostel (Girls)
2) Chhawkhlei Hostel (Girls)
3) Dingdi Hostel (Girls)
4) Senhri Hostel (Girls)
5) Zamzo Hostel (Girls)
6) Buannel Hostel (Boys)
7) Chalfilh Hostel (Boys)
8) Hmuifang Hostel (Boys)
9) Lengteng Hostel (Boys)
10) Phawngpui Hostel (Boys)
11) Tantlang Hostel (Boys)
12) Thorang Hostel (Boys)

The campus also has a University Guesthouse for guests and students. There is also a Church inside the campus.

References

External links

 
Central universities in India
Educational institutions established in 2001
Education in Aizawl
2001 establishments in Mizoram